Adam Matysek (born 19 July 1968) is a Polish former professional footballer who played as a goalkeeper, who is currently the chairman of Polish club Górnik Zabrze. 

He made 34 appearances for the Poland national team, and was a member of their squad at the 2002 FIFA World Cup, although he did not play any matches at the tournament.

Post-playing career
After his retirement, Matysek worked for the Polish Football Association as their U21 goalkeeping coach. He was then recruited by Martin Bader, the director of football at 1. FC Nürnberg, for the same role.

From 23 November 2016 until 19 February 2018, he served as the sporting director of his former club, Śląsk Wrocław. On 16 February 2023, he was named chairman of another Ekstraklasa side Górnik Zabrze.

Personal life
Matysek is married and has two daughters.

International

References

External links
 
 
 

Living people
1968 births
People from Piekary Śląskie
Sportspeople from Silesian Voivodeship
Polish footballers
Association football goalkeepers
Poland international footballers
Śląsk Wrocław players
SC Fortuna Köln players
FC Gütersloh 2000 players
Bayer 04 Leverkusen players
Zagłębie Lubin players
RKS Radomsko players
2002 FIFA World Cup players
Bundesliga players
2. Bundesliga players
Ekstraklasa players
Polish expatriate footballers
Polish expatriate sportspeople in Germany
Expatriate footballers in Germany
Association football goalkeeping coaches